Ngangla Gewog (Dzongkha: ངང་ལ་) is a gewog (village block) of Zhemgang District, Bhutan, bordering India. Ngangla Gewog is also a part of Panbang Dungkhag (sub-district), along with Goshing, Bjoka, and Phangkhar Gewogs.

In the 2005 census, the gewog had a population of 1018.

References

Further reading
Wayo Wayo-Voices from the Past April 2004

Gewogs of Bhutan